George Washington Tew (November 13, 1829 – November 8, 1884) was an American Union brevet brigadier general during the period of the American Civil War.

Biography
Born in Newport, Rhode Island, Tew joined the Rhode Island Home Guards in 1846.  In 1860 he became commanding officer (with the rank of colonel) of the Newport Artillery Company.  

When the Civil War began, he was commissioned a captain in the 4th Rhode Island Infantry and was soon promoted to lieutenant colonel.  Tew fought at the Battle of Roanoke Island, the Battle of New Bern, and the Siege of Fort Macon.  He prominently participated in the rescue of Massachusetts troops at Little Washington in North Carolina.  In 1863, the 5th Rhode Island Infantry was reformed as a heavy artillery unit, and Tew was promoted to lieutenant colonel.  He served with the 5th Rhode Island until the regiment was mustered out of service in June 1865.  After the war, he received his commission as a brevet brigadier general, dated to March 13, 1865, in honor of his distinguished service during the war.

Dates of Rank
Colonel, Rhode Island Militia - April 1860
Captain, Company F, 1st Rhode Island Detached Militia - April 1861
Honorably Mustered Out of Service - 2 August 1861
Captain, 4th Rhode Island Infantry - September 1861
Major, 4th Rhode Island Infantry - 30 October 1861
Lieutenant Colonel, 4th Rhode Island Infantry - 20 November 1861
Resigned - 11 August 1862
Captain, 5th Rhode Island Infantry - 24 September 1862
Major, 5th Rhode Island Infantry - 1 October 1862
Lieutenant Colonel, 5th Rhode Island Heavy Artillery - 2 March 1863
Brevet Brigadier General - 13 March 1865
Honorably Mustered Out of Service - 26 June 1865

References

External links

See also

1829 births
1884 deaths
People of Rhode Island in the American Civil War
Union Army officers